Selice (formerly) is a village and municipality in Šaľa District, in the Nitra Region of south-west Slovakia.

Geography
The village lies at an altitude of 113 metres and covers an area of 38.36 km².

History
In historical records the village was first mentioned in 1078. In the 16th century, it was destroyed by Ottoman Turks.  After the Habsburg monarchy collapse in November 1918, Czechoslovak troops occupied the area, later acknowledged internationally by the Treaty of Trianon. Between 1938 and 1945 Selice nad Dunajom once more  became part of Miklós Horthy's Hungary through the First Vienna Award. From 1945 until the Velvet Divorce, it was part of Czechoslovakia. Since then it has been part of Slovakia. In 1946, the separate (and larger) village of Šók (Slovak; Sók or Magyarsók in Hungarian, Šóka in Romani) became part of Selice.

Population
According to the 2011 census, the municipality had 2,859 inhabitants. 1,416 of inhabitants were Hungarians, 1,241 Slovaks,  107 Roma, 18 Czechs and 77 others and unspecified.

In a 2001 census, 59% (1682) of the inhabitants claimed Hungarian ethnicity, 36% (1011) Slovak ethnicity and 4% (108) Romani (Gypsy) ethnicity.

In a 1991 census, the numbers were 75% (2079), 21% (565) and 3% (83), respectively. The main reason behind the apparent decrease in the number of ethnic Hungarians is the fact that most Roma, who in fact represented 52% (1479) of the village population in 2005, claimed Slovak or Hungarian ethnicity. According to a 1968 census, there were 787 ‘citizens of Gypsy origin’ in Selice.

Facilities
The village has a public library and a gymnasium.

References

External links
https://web.archive.org/web/20070513023228/http://www.statistics.sk/mosmis/eng/run.html
Selice Romani Vocabulary List (from the World Loanword Database)

Villages and municipalities in Šaľa District